Stanislav Mikhailovich Batishchev (1940 – 22 May 2011) was a Soviet heavyweight weightlifter. Between 1966 and 1973 he won four European silver medals and three bronze medals at world championships. In 1970 he set a world record in the press. His career was hindered by severe competition within the Soviet Union, primarily with Vasily Alekseyev and Leonid Zhabotinsky.

References

1940 births
2011 deaths
Soviet male weightlifters
European Weightlifting Championships medalists
World Weightlifting Championships medalists